The A 11 road is an A-Grade trunk road in Sri Lanka. It connects the Maradankadawala with Tirikkondiadimadu.

The A 11 passes through Ganewalpola, Habarana, Moragaswewa, Minneriya, Polannaruwa, Kaduruwela, Manampitiya, Welikanda, Punani and Vakaneri to reach Tirikkondiadimadu.

References

Highways in Sri Lanka
Transport in Eastern Province, Sri Lanka